The Wildwoods are a group of five communities (four distinct municipalities and one census-designated place) in Cape May County, New Jersey. These are situated on the Island of Five Mile Beach, a barrier island facing the Atlantic Ocean. These Jersey Shore communities have relatively small year-round populations that swell significantly during the summer with vacationers.

While the communities have no shared governance (other than Cape May County), with each community reporting to a different local government, the term is often used to refer collectively to the area. All of the communities are part of the greater Delaware Valley or Philadelphia metropolitan area. 

From north to south, the five communities are:

 North Wildwood (2010 Census population: 4,041) 
 West Wildwood (pop. 603)
 Wildwood (pop. 5,325)
 Wildwood Crest (pop. 3,270)
 Diamond Beach (pop. 136), a census-designated place in Lower Township

Wildwoods Shore Resort Historic District

The Wildwoods is home to over 200 motels, built during the Doo-Wop era of the 1950s and 1960s, in an area recognized by the state of New Jersey known as the Wildwoods Shore Resort Historic District. The term doo-wop was coined by Cape May's Mid-Atlantic Center For The Arts in the early 1990s to describe the unique, space-age architectural style, which is also referred to as the Googie or populuxe style.

See also
For other groups of similarly named municipalities in New Jersey, see:
The Amboys
The Brunswicks
The Caldwells
The Oranges
The Plainfields
The Ridgefields

References

Seaside resorts in New Jersey